The Apertura 2017 Liga MX championship stage commonly known as Liguilla (mini league) was played from 22 November to 10 December 2017. A total of eight teams competed in the championship stage to decide the champions of the Apertura 2017 Liga MX season. Both finalists qualified to the 2019 CONCACAF Champions League.

Qualified teams

Format
Teams are re-seeded each round.
Team with more goals on aggregate after two matches advances.
Away goals rule is applied in the quarterfinals and semifinals, but not the final.
In the quarterfinals and semifinals, if the two teams are tied on aggregate and away goals, the higher seeded team advances.
In the final, if the two teams are tied after both legs, the match goes to extra time and, if necessary, a shoot-out.
Both finalists qualify to the 2019 CONCACAF Champions League (in Pot 3).

Bracket

Quarterfinals

|}

All times are UTC−6

First leg

Second leg

2–2 on aggregate and tied on away goals. UANL advanced for being the higher seed in the classification table.

3–3 on aggregate and tied on away goals. Morelia advanced for being the higher seed in the classification table.

Monterrey won 6–2 on aggregate

0–0 on aggregate and tied on away goals. América advanced for being the higher seed in the classification table.

Semifinals

|}

All times are UTC−6

First leg

Second leg

UANL won 4–0 on aggregate

Monterrey won 5–0 on aggregate

Finals

|}

All times are UTC−6

First leg

Second leg

UANL won 3–2 on aggregate

Goalscorers
6 goals
 Rogelio Funes Mori (Monterrey)

3 goals
 Avilés Hurtado (Monterrey)
 Enner Valencia (UANL)

2 goals
 André-Pierre Gignac (UANL)
 Raúl Ruidíaz (Morelia)
 Carlos Sánchez (Monterrey)
 Fernando Uribe (Toluca)
 Eduardo Vargas (UANL)

1 goal
 Pablo Barrientos (Toluca)
 Mauro Boselli (León)
 Francisco Meza (UANL)
 Andrés Mosquera (León)
 Dorlan Pabón (Monterrey)
 Nicolás Sánchez (Monterrey)
 Ángel Sepúlveda (Morelia)
 Christian Tabó (Atlas)
 Juninho (UANL)

References

 
1
Liga MX seasons